The Tamiami Formation is a Late Miocene to Pliocene geologic formation in the southwest Florida peninsula.

Age 
Period: Neogene
Epoch: Late Miocene to Pliocene
Faunal stage: Clarendonian through Blancan ~13.06–2.588 mya, calculates to a period of

Location 

The Tamiami Formation appears in the counties of Charlotte, Lee, Hendry, Collier and Monroe. It is widespread in Florida and part of the intermediate confining aquifer system. The Tamiami formation overlies the Hawthorn at every locality where the Hawthorn has been penetrated and is overlain unconformably by the Caloosahatchee marl of the Pliocene in Charlotte County.

Composition 
The Tamiami Formation contains a wide range of mixed carbonate-siliciclastic lithologies and associated faunas. It occurs at or near the land surface in the southern peninsula with numerous named and unnamed members recognized within the Tamiami Formation. Its unevenness indicates that the upper part has been subjected to erosion.

Lithologies 
The Tamiami Formation includes:
 light gray to tan, unconsolidated, fine to coarse grained sand with fossils
 light gray to green, poorly consolidated, fossil bearing sandy clay to clayey sand
 light gray, poorly consolidated, very fine to medium grained, calcareous, fossil bearing sand
 white to light gray, poorly consolidated, sandy, fossil bearing limestone
 white to light gray, moderately to well hardened, sandy, fossiliferous limestone
Phosphate is present in limited quantities throughout the Tamiami in sand and gravel.

Sub-units 
 Bonita Springs Marl Member
 Golden Gate Reef Member
 Ochopee Limestone Member
 Pinecrest Sand Member

Fossils 
Fossils appear in casts and molds, as well as original material. 
 Barnacles
 Mollusks (Ostrea disparilis, Chione ulocyma, and Turritella pontoni)
 Corals
 Echinoids
 Foraminifers
 Nanoplankton (calcareous)

References

Further reading 
 Finch, J., Geological essay on the Tertiary formation in America: American Journal of Science, v. 7, p. 31–43, 1823.
 Berkenkotter, Richard D,  Application of statistical analysis in evaluating bedded deposits of variable thickness—Florida phosphate data (United States. Bureau of Mines. Report of investigations, U.S. Dept. of the Interior, Bureau of Mines (1964)

Geologic formations of Florida
Miocene United States
Miocene Series of North America
Neogene Florida
Sandstone formations of the United States
Limestone formations of the United States
Fossiliferous stratigraphic units of North America
Paleontology in Florida